This is a list of early pre-recorded sound and part talking/ all talking feature films made in the US and Europe during the transition to sound, between 1926-1929. During this time a variety of recording systems were used, including most notably sound on film formats such as Movietone and RCA Photophone, as well as sound on disc formats like Vitaphone for instance. This list includes film titles, release dates, production companies, audio type and its current archive status; denoting whether it exists, lost, incomplete, the film or audio elements exist only, as well as the number of discs extant for films recorded with Vitaphone soundtracks.

1926

1927

1928

1929

Links 

The Vitaphone Project
Silent Era.com: list of early Sound Films
Film Sound History: Online Articles
List of Sound Features 1926-1935: www.vitaphone.org/features.html
List of early Warner Bros. sound and talking features
Technicolor History
Vitaphone Soundtrack Collection
Warner Archive
 Vitaphone
 Movietone
 RCA Photophone
 Sound Film

References

Footnotes 

History of film
1926-related lists
1927-related lists
1928-related lists
1929-related lists
1926 in film
1927 in film
1928 in film
1929 in film